Clube Desportivo Escola Norberto de Castro is an Angolan sports club from Viana, Luanda.
The team currently plays in the Gira Angola and plays their home games at the state-owned Estádio da Cidadela.

The club is owned by and named after Mr. Norberto de Castro, the owner of a namesake sports compound and youth football academy in Viana, Luanda.

Achievements
Angolan League: 0

Angolan Cup: 0

Angolan SuperCup: 0

Gira Angola: 0

League & Cup Positions

Manager history

Players

See also
Girabola

External links
 Official blog
 Girabola.com Profile

References

Football clubs in Angola
Sports clubs in Angola